Portion may refer to:

 Dominant portion, in real estate appraising
 Marriage portion, another term for dowry.
 Serving size, the typical amount of a certain food eaten (or recommended for eating) at one seating

See also
 
 
 Cavernous portion (disambiguation), in physiology
 Petrous portion (disambiguation), in physiology
 Portion control (disambiguation)

Related concepts
 Fragment (disambiguation)
 Part (disambiguation)
 Piece (disambiguation)
 Segment (disambiguation)
 Slice (disambiguation)